In historical linguistics, the history of the Chinese language includes the various changes over time of the Chinese language in its various incarnations. Earliest known origins of the Chinese language date back 4,500 years. Modern day characters had not been introduced until centuries later, leaving many components of Chinese language quite obscure and unknown.

Sino-Tibetan ancestry

Chinese is part of the Sino-Tibetan language family, a group of languages that all descend from Proto-Sino-Tibetan.  The relationship between Chinese and other Sino-Tibetan languages is an area of active research and controversy, as is the attempt to reconstruct Proto-Sino-Tibetan. The main difficulty in both of these efforts is that, while there is very good documentation that allows for the reconstruction of the ancient sounds of Chinese, there is no written documentation of the point where Chinese split from the rest of the Sino-Tibetan languages.  This is actually a common problem in historical linguistics, a field which often incorporates the comparative method to deduce these sorts of changes. Unfortunately the use of this technique for Sino-Tibetan languages has not as yet yielded satisfactory results, perhaps because many of the languages that would allow for a more complete reconstruction of Proto-Sino-Tibetan are very poorly documented or understood. Therefore, despite their affinity, the common ancestry of the Chinese and Tibeto-Burman languages remains an unproven hypothesis.
Categorization of the development of Chinese is a subject of scholarly debate. One of the first systems was devised by the Swedish linguist Bernhard Karlgren in the early 1900s. The system was much revised, but always heavily relied on Karlgren's insights and methods.

Old Chinese
Old Chinese, sometimes known as "Archaic Chinese", is genetically related to all current dialects of Chinese. The first known use of the Chinese writing system is divinatory inscriptions into tortoise shells and oracle bones in the Shang dynasty (1766–1122 BC). In the later early and middle Zhou dynasty (1122–256 BC), writing which descended from the Shang is found texts of which include inscriptions on bronze artifacts, the poetry of the Shijing, the history of the Shujing, and portions of the Yijing. The phonetic elements found in the majority of Chinese characters also provide hints to their Old Chinese pronunciations. The pronunciation of the borrowed Chinese characters in both Japanese and Vietnamese also provide valuable insights. Old Chinese was not wholly uninflected. It possessed a rich sound system in which aspiration or rough breathing differentiated the consonants, but probably was still without tones. Work on reconstructing Old Chinese started with Qing dynasty philologists.

Middle Chinese
Middle Chinese was the language used during the Sui dynasty (隋朝), Tang dynasty(唐朝), and Song dynasty(宋朝), or the sixth to tenth centuries AD. It can be divided into an early period, which can be shown by the Qieyun rime dictionary (AD 601) and its later redaction the Guangyun, and a late period in the tenth century, reflected by rime tables such as the Yunjing. The evidence for the pronunciation of Middle Chinese comes from several sources: modern dialect variations, rime dictionaries, foreign transliterations, rime tables constructed by ancient Chinese philologists to summarize the phonetic system, and Chinese phonetic translations of foreign words.

Spoken Chinese
The development of the spoken Chinese from early historical times to the present has been complex. Most Chinese people, in Sichuan and in a broad arc from the northeast (Manchuria) to the southwest (Yunnan), use various Mandarin dialects as their home language. The prevalence of Mandarin throughout northern China is largely due to north China's plains. By contrast, the mountains and rivers of southern China favoured linguistic diversity.

Until the mid-20th century, most southern Chinese only spoke their native local variety of Chinese. However, despite the mix of officials and commoners speaking various Chinese dialects, Nanjing Mandarin became dominant at least during  the Qing dynasty. Since the 17th century, the Empire had already been setting up orthoepy academies to make pronunciation conform to the Qing capital Beijing's standard, but had little success. During the Qing's last 50 years in the late 19th century, the Beijing Mandarin finally replaced Nanjing Mandarin in the imperial court. For the general population, although variations of Mandarin were already widely spoken in China then, a single standard of Mandarin did not exist. The non-Mandarin speakers in southern China also continued to use their local languages for each and every aspect of life. The new Beijing Mandarin court standard was thus fairly limited.

This situation changed with the creation (in both the PRC and the ROC, but not in Hong Kong and Macau) of an elementary school education system committed to teaching Modern Standard Chinese (Mandarin). As a result, Mandarin is now spoken by virtually all people in mainland China and on Taiwan. At the time of the widespread introduction of Mandarin in mainland China and Taiwan, Hong Kong was a British colony and Mandarin was never used at all. In Hong Kong, Macau, Guangdong and sometimes Guangxi, the language of daily life, education, formal speech and business remains in the local Cantonese. Due to historic trade and travel of foreign merchants, the Chinese language has adopted a significantly wide array of Japanese words historically which have been adopted in conjunction with Chinese dialect, accent and pronunciation, referred to as the sinification or sinofication (lit. "make, turn or adopt into Chinese") of foreign words. As a result, many lexicographers pass this off due to historical intervention by Chinese historians to not include or forget to include as part of imported foreign words and because of the evolution of languages; most Han characters have a single reading and would have lost the previous vocal reading in correlation to using the new reading institutionally and therefore becoming mainstream. This also applies to Mongolian vocabulary adopted from Southern Mongolia through leading historical figures and dynasties.

Written Chinese 
During the reign of the dynasties, Guanhua ("officials' speech"), which was almost exclusively utilized by the educated people of Peking and bureaucrats (or mandarins), was the most used form of writing. With a standardized writing system for all official documents and communication, unification of the mutually unintelligible spoken dialects was possible. After the establishment of the Chinese Nationalist Party, the 1913 Conference on Unification of Pronunciation planned to widely use and teach Mandarin as the official national standard, changing Guanhua to Guoyu ("National Language"). Continuing previous policies, the People's Republic of China sought to further standardize a common language, now dubbed Putonghua ("Common Speech"), for national and political unity. In aims of reducing the country's approximately 80% illiteracy rate, the "Decision of the Chinese Communist Party Central Committee and State Council Concerning Elimination of Illiteracy" of March 1956 solidified the Communist Party's plans to reform the country's traditional characters to a simplified writing system.

Besides the standard writing systems promoted by the government, no other written Chinese language has been widely established and utilized to an extent comparable to Standard Chinese.

See also 
 Ancient China
 List of language histories

Notes

References